Vokkaliga Ramachandra Raghunath (born 1 November 1988) is a former Indian professional field hockey player. He played as a fullback and was known for his abilities as a drag flicker.

Early life
Raghunath was born on 1 November 1988 to a former Indian field hockey player V. S. Ramachandra and Doddamane Bojamma along with his two sisters, Niveditha Sanketh and Kavana Yatheesh.

Career
Raghunath made his debut for India in the sub-junior side in the 2003 sub-junior Asia Cup in Dhaka that India won. He made his senior debut in the national side during the bi-lateral series in 2005 against Pakistan, as a replacement to an injured Sandeep Singh. He was a part of the Indian team that won bronze in the 2007 Sultan Azlan Shah Cup, silver in 2008, gold in the 2007 Asia Cup and silver in 2013. Having scored six goals in the 2013 Asia Cup, Raghunath was awarded the 'Best Player of the Tournament'.

Hockey India League
In the auction of the inaugural Hockey India League, Raghunath was bought by the Uttar Pradesh franchise for US$76,000 with his base price being US$13,900. The team was named Uttar Pradesh Wizards. He captained the team to a third-place finish in the inaugural season. He ended the first season having scored 9 goals in 14 games and the second season scoring 8 goals in 12 games.

References

External links
 V. R. Raghunath at Hockey India

Olympic field hockey players of India
Field hockey players at the 2012 Summer Olympics
Field hockey players at the 2016 Summer Olympics
1988 births
Living people
Field hockey players from Karnataka
People from Kodagu district
Field hockey players at the 2014 Commonwealth Games
Asian Games medalists in field hockey
Field hockey players at the 2006 Asian Games
Field hockey players at the 2014 Asian Games
Indian male field hockey players
Asian Games gold medalists for India
Commonwealth Games silver medallists for India
Commonwealth Games medallists in field hockey
Medalists at the 2014 Asian Games
Recipients of the Arjuna Award
2006 Men's Hockey World Cup players
2014 Men's Hockey World Cup players
Medallists at the 2014 Commonwealth Games